The Integration and Development Centre for Information and Research or IDC is a non-governmental organization from Simferopol, Crimea, Ukraine, founded in 1997. It aims to promote civil society, democracy, tolerance and intercultural relations in Crimea.

In 2009, the centre was chosen by an international jury led by the OSCE High Commissioner on National Minorities to receive the Max van der Stoel Award from the Ministry for Foreign Affairs of the Netherlands.

References

External links
Centre's website

Organizations based in Simferopol
Organizations established in 1997
1997 establishments in Ukraine
Think tanks based in Ukraine